The National Grid Office or "NGO" is an entity in Singapore which was established on 2 January 2003 to fulfill the mission of the National Grid and promote the adoption of Grid computing in Singapore.

The National Grid has the mission of transforming Singapore into a nation where computer resources can be interconnected via a next-generation cyberinfrastructure that allows the sharing of computing resources in a secure, reliable, and efficient manner by authenticated users for education, commerce entertainment, R&D, and national security. It aims to improve the economic and technological competitiveness of the country.

References

2003 establishments in Singapore
Science and technology in Singapore
Scientific organisations based in Singapore